Stephen Cox  (born 1946 in Bristol) is a British sculptor, known for his monolithic public artworks in stone.

He trained at the Central School of Art and Design, London, from 1966-1968. and attended the sixth Indian Triennale in 1986 in New Delhi, to represent the United Kingdom. His style mixes  Italian, Egyptian and Indian traditions. He also works in wood, and has exhibited at the Royal Academy.

He lives and works in a former farmhouse at Clee Hill, Shropshire, England and has a second home in Mahabalipuram, India, where he also works.

Works 

Cox's works include:

 
  (imperial porphyry and white diorite stone)
 
  (diorite stone)
 
 
 
 
  (war memorial)
 
 
 
  (sandstone, pictured)

References

Further reading

External links 

 
 Selected CV at the Royal Academy website
 Stephen Cox entry at Cass Sculpture Foundation 
 Profile on Royal Academy of Arts Collections

1946 births
British abstract artists
Alumni of the Central School of Art and Design
British sculptors
British male sculptors
Artists from Bristol
Artists from Shropshire
Living people
English contemporary artists
Royal Academicians